Heinz Weigel (born 11 April 1938) is an East German rower who represented the United Team of Germany. He competed at the 1960 Summer Olympics in Rome with the men's coxless pair where they came fourth.

References

1938 births
Living people
People from Halberstadt
People from the Province of Saxony
West German male rowers
Sportspeople from Saxony-Anhalt
Olympic rowers of the United Team of Germany
Rowers at the 1960 Summer Olympics